Zarreh may refer to:
 Zarreh, Hamadan 
 Zarreh, Kerman